Martin Latka (born 28 September 1984) is a Czech professional footballer who plays as central defender.

Club career 
Latka began his career with SK Dynamo České Budějovice, joining Slavia Prague in 2003. In 2005, he won the Talent of the Year award at the Czech Footballer of the Year awards. On 30 January 2006, he joined Birmingham City on loan  until the end of the season. He played six full games. However, in that season Birmingham were relegated and Latka returned to Slavia.

In January 2009, Latka joined Panionios. In 2011, he returned to Slavia Prague.

In January 2013, he was transferred to Bundesliga side Fortuna Düsseldorf, signing a one-and-a-half year contract with the German club. After a year and a half at Fortuna Düsseldorf, Martin Latka's contract was not extended in May 2014. The defender made a return to SK Slavia Prague.

International career 
Although he won the Czech Talent of the Year award in 2005 and was a regular in Czech U21 setup, he was not called up to the senior national team for a long time. He made is national debut in November 2012 in a friendly match against Slovakia as late as at the age of 28.

References

External links 
 
 
 

1984 births
People from Hluboká nad Vltavou
Living people
Association football defenders
Czech footballers
Czech Republic youth international footballers
Czech Republic under-21 international footballers
Czech Republic international footballers
Czech First League players
SK Dynamo České Budějovice players
SK Slavia Prague players
Birmingham City F.C. players
Panionios F.C. players
Fortuna Düsseldorf players
FC Slovan Liberec players
Premier League players
Super League Greece players
Bundesliga players
2. Bundesliga players
Czech expatriate footballers
Expatriate footballers in England
Expatriate footballers in Greece
Expatriate footballers in Germany
Sportspeople from the South Bohemian Region